Reverend Frederick Ayer (d. 28 September 1867) was a missionary from the American Missionary Association who came to Atlanta, Georgia in 1865 to help set up schools for newly freed slaves (freedmen).  

Ayer was born in Uxbridge, Massachusetts; he served as a missionary among Native Americans in Wisconsin and Minnesota from 1843 to 1863, and at that time he started a school in Fort Ripley, Minnesota.  When Ayer arrived in Atlanta, he took over the educational work started by freedmen James Tate and Grandison B. Daniels.  Tate and Daniels had started the "first school in Atlanta for African American children on the corner of Courtland and Jenkins Streets in a building owned by Bethel A.M.E. Church"; this school would eventually become Atlanta University.  Ayer also organized a public school that became Summer Hill School.  Ayers died on 28 September, 1867.

References

External Links

American Missionary Association
Educators from Georgia (U.S. state)
American Protestant missionaries
Clark Atlanta University
1867 deaths
Date of birth missing
Place of birth missing
Protestant missionaries in the United States
Missionary educators